For articles (arranged alphabetically) related to Georgia, see :Category:Georgia (country)

0–9 

 .ge

A 

 Abasha
 Abashidze, Aslan
 Abdushelishvili, Malkhaz
 Abkhaz alphabet
 Abkhaz language
 Abkhazi, Kote
 Abkhazia
 Abkhaz–Georgian conflict
 Abkhazian Regional Academy of Sciences
 Abkhazians
 Abo Tbileli
 Aeetes
 Aiba, Garri
 Ajaria
 Ajaria crisis, 2004
 Aka Morchiladze
 Akhalkalaki
 Akhaltsikhe
 Akunin, Boris
 Alasania, Irakli
 Alaverdi (monastery)
 Alavidze
 Ali Bey Al-Kabir
 Ambrosi
 Amilakhvari, Dimitri
 Amtsakhara
 Ananiashvili, Nino
 Ankvab, Alexander
 Anthem of the Georgian Soviet Socialist Republic
 Antim Iverianul
 April 9, 1989 Massacre
 Archaeopolis
 Ardzinba, Vladislav
 Arshak I of Iberia
 Artag of Iberia
 Arveladze, Shota
 Asatiani, Lado
 August Uprising in Georgia
 Avalishvili, Zurab
 Azmaiparashvili, Zurab
 Azo (Georgian history)

B 

 Bachkovo Monastery
 Bacurios Hiberios
 Bagapsh, Sergei
 Bagrat I the Little
 Bagrat III of Georgia
 Bagrat III of Imereti
 Bagrat IV of Georgia
 Bagration, Jorge de
 Bagration, Pyotr
 Bagrationi, Alexandre
 Bagrationi, Teimuraz
 Bagrationi, Vakhushti
 Bagrationi
 Bakhtadze, Mamuka
 Bakuriani
 Baku-Tbilisi-Ceyhan pipeline
 Balanchine, George
 Baramidze, Giorgi
 Batonishvili
 Bats language
 Battle of Basian
 Battle of Chalagani
 Battle of Didgori
 Battle of Digomi
 Battle of Krtsanisi
 Battle of Sasireti
 Battle of Shamkor
 Batumi
 Beria, Lavrenty
 Bolnisi
 Borjomi
 Borodin, Alexander
 Burchuladze, Paata
 Burjanadze, Nino
 Byzantine–Georgian wars
 Byzeres

C 

 Cabinet of Bidzina Ivanishvili
 Cabinet of Giorgi Kvirikashvili, first
 Cabinet of Giorgi Kvirikashvili, second
 Cabinet of Irakli Garibashvili
 Cabinet of Mamuka Bakhtadze
 Catholicos-Patriarch of All Georgia
 Caucasian Iberia
 Caucasian Iberians
 Caucasus Airlines
 Chalybes
 Chanturia, Giorgi
 Chiaberashvili, Zurab
 Chiatura
 Chibirov, Ludwig
 Chiburdanidze, Maia
 Chikobava, Arnold
 Chikvaidze, Aleksandr
 Chilashvili, Levan
 Cholokashvili, Kakutsa
 Choloki River
 Irakli Chubinishvili
 Chuburkhindji
 Coat of Arms of Georgia
 Colchis
 Colchians
 Commonwealth of Independent States
 Communist Party of Abkhazia
 Communist Party of Georgia
 Constantine I of Imereti
 Cooperation for a Green Future
 Culture of Georgia

D 

 Dadeshkeliani, Kati
 Dadeshkeliani, Konstantine
 Dadeshkeliani
 Dadiani, Andria
 Dadiani, Salome
 Dadiani
 David Soslani
 David IV of Georgia
 David V of Georgia
 David VI Narin
 David VII Ulu
 David VIII of Georgia
 Demetre I
 Demetre II of Georgia
 Democratic Republic of Georgia
 Democratic Union for Revival
 Demographics of Georgia
 Diaokhi
 Dideba zetsit kurtheuls
 Didube metro station, Tbilisi
 FC Dinamo Tbilisi
 Djergenia, Anri
 Dmanisi
 Dodashvili, Solomon
 Dogonadze, Revaz
 Dolidze, Ana
 Drilae
 Duke, Vernon
 Dusheti
 Dvali, Gia

E 

 Economy of Georgia
 Egrisi
 Elections in Abkhazia
 Elections in Georgia (country)
 Elections in South Ossetia
 Embryon
 Empire of Trebizond
 Ensemble Georgika
 Erekle II
 Esebua, Kristine

F 

 Farnadjom of Iberia
 FC Tbilisi
 FC WIT Georgia
 Flag of Abkhazia
 Flag of Ajaria
 Flag of Georgia (country)
 Flag of the Georgian Soviet Socialist Republic
 Foreign relations of Georgia (country)
 Freedom Movement (Georgia)

G 

 Gabadadze, Gregory
 Gagra
 Gagulia, Gennady
 Gali
 Gamkrelidze, David
 Gamkrelidze, Tamaz
 Gamsakhurdia, Konstantine
 Gamsakhurdia, Zviad
 Gaprindashvili, Nona
 Gegechkori, Evgeni
 Gelati Monastery
 Geography of Georgia (country)
 Georgia (country)
 Georgia at the 1996 Summer Olympics
 Georgia at the 2000 Summer Olympics
 Georgia at the 2004 Summer Olympics
 Georgia legislative election, 2003
 Georgia legislative election, 2004
 Georgia national football team
 Georgia national football team results
 Georgia national rugby union team
 Georgia presidential election, 2004
 Georgia Tbilisi TV Broadcasting Tower
 Georgia Train and Equip Program
 Georgian Academy of Sciences
 Georgian Airways
 Georgian alphabet
 The Georgian Charter of Journalistic Ethics
 Georgian Civil Aviation Administration
 Georgian Civil War
 Georgian Co-Investment Fund
 Georgian Football Federation
 Georgian grammar
 Georgian International Academy
 Georgian Jews
 Georgian Labour Party
 Georgian language
 Georgian Legion (1914–18)
 Georgian Legion (1941–45)
 Georgian Military Road
 Georgian mythology
 Georgian National Airlines
 Georgian Orthodox and Apostolic Church
 Georgian people
 Georgian Soviet Socialist Republic
 Georgian State Electrosystem
 Georgian Technical University
 Georgian United Communist Party
 Georgian Uprising of Texel
 Georgian verb paradigm
 Georgian–Armenian War
 Georgian–Ossetian conflict
 Georgians in Iran
 German involvement in Georgian–Abkhaz conflict
 Giorgadze, Igor
 Giorgi I of Georgia
 Giorgi II of Georgia
 Giorgi III of Georgia
 Giorgi IV of Georgia
 Giorgi VI of Georgia
 Giorgi XI of Kartli
 Golden Fleece
 Gongadze Georgiy R.
 Gordeli, Otar
 Gori
 Gori District
 Green Party (Georgia)
 Gregory Pakourianos
 GUAM Organization for Democracy and Economic Development
 Gudauta
 Gugars
 Gugushvili, Bessarion
 Guria
 Gvaladze, Evgen

H 

 Healthcare in Georgia
 Heniochi
 Hereti
 History of Ajaria
 History of Georgia

I 

 Iakob Tsurtaveli
 Iberian War
 Ibero-Caucasian languages
 Ikalto
 Ilia II
 Saint Ilia the Righteous
 Imereti
 Industry will save Georgia
 Ingorokva, Pavle
 Intellectuals League of Georgia
 Ioseliani, Jaba
 Ioseliani, Otar
 ISO 3166-2:GE

J 

 Janashia, Nikoloz
 Janashia, Simon
 Japaridze, Tedo
 Java, Georgia
 Javakhishvili, Ivane
 Jumber Patiashvili – Unity
 Jvari (disambiguation)

K 

 Kakabadze, Sargis
 Kakheti
 Kaladze, Kakha
 Kancheli, Giya
 Kartli
 Kartl-Kakheti
 Kartveli, Alexander
 Kaskians
 Kasrashvili, Makvala
 Keda, Georgia
 Kelesh Bey, Prince of Abkhazia
 Kereselidze, Leo
 Ketevan the Martyr
 Khadjimba, Raul
 Khashba, Nodar
 Khevsureti
 Khizanishvili, Zurab
 Kingdom of Abkhazia
 Kingdom of Kakheti
 Kingdom of Kartli
 Kingdom of Kartl-Kakheti
 Kingdom of Georgia
 Kitovani, Tengiz
 Kmara
 Kobuleti
 Kodori Valley
 Kokkai
 Kokoity, Eduard
 Kostava, Merab
 Kutaisi
 Kvinitadze Giorgi

L 

 Labadze, Irakli
 Lagodekhi
 Lari (Georgia)
 Laz language
 Laz people
 Lazica
 Lazic War
 Lentekhi
 LGBT rights in Georgia
 Likani
 List of cities in Georgia
 List of foreign ministers of Abkhazia
 List of Georgian Wars
 List of Georgian writers
 List of Georgians
 List of political parties in Abkhazia
 List of political parties in Georgia
 List of political parties in South Ossetia
 List of prime ministers of Abkhazia
 List of Tbilisi Metro stations
 List of the Kings of Georgia
 Lugela Valley

M 

 Machelones
 Macrones
 Maglakelidze, Shalva
 Mamardashvili, Merab
 Manraloi
 March 9 Massacre in Tbilisi, 1956
 Margvelashvili, Giorgi
 Margvelashvili, Giorgi
 Margwelaschwili, Giwi
 Margwelaschwili, Tite
 Marr, Nikolay
 Martvili
 Mayakovsky, Vladimir
 Mazniashvili, Giorgi
 Mchedlidze Guram
 Medea
 Megrelian language
 Melikishvili, Giorgi
 Melua, Katie
 Mengrelia
 Merabishvili, Vano
 Meshech
 Meskheti
 Mestia
 Michael I of Imereti
 Mikheil, Prince of Abkhazia
 Miles, Richard (diplomat)
 Military of Georgia
 Mirian I of Iberia
 Mirian II of Iberia
 Mirian III of Iberia
 Misimians
 Mislimov, Shirali
 Mkhedrioni
 Monastery of the Cross
 Mossynoeci
 Mount Kazbek
 Mtkvari
 Mtskheta
 Music of Georgia
 Mushki
 Muskhelishvili, Nikoloz
 Mzhavanadze, Vasily

N 
 Nadareishvili, Tamaz
 Nadarejshvili, Zurab
 Narikala fortress
 National Democratic Alliance (Georgia)
 National Democratic Party (Georgia)
 New Communist Party of Georgia
 New Right (Georgia)
 Niko the Boer
 Nino (Saint)
 Nogaideli, Zurab
 Nutsubidze, Shalva

O 
 Okruashvili, Irakli
 Okudjava, Bulat
 Oni, Georgia
 Ossetic language
 Ottoman invasion of western Georgia (1703)
 Otyrba, Gueorgui
 Ozgan, Konstantin

P 
 Paliashvili, Zakharia
 Papashvily, George
 Parajanov, Sergei
 Parnavaz I of Iberia
 Parnavaz II of Iberia
 Patarkatsishvili, Badri
 Pelasgian
 People's Front (Georgia)
 Peradze, Grigol
 Peter the Iberian
 Phasians
 Pirosmanashvili, Niko
 Politics of Georgia (country)
 Post-Soviet states
 Poti
 President of Georgia
 President of South Ossetia
 Prime Minister of Georgia
 Princes of Abkhazia

Q 
 Q'vareli

R 
 Racha
 Radde, Gustav
 Razikashvili, Levan
 Religion and religious freedom in Georgia
 Republican Party (Abkhazia)
 Revival (Abkhazia)
 Revived Communist Party of Georgia
 Rhadamistus
 Rightist Opposition
 Rioni River
 Rizhvadze, Tornike
 Robakidze, Grigol
 Roelofs, Sandra E.
 Roman Catholicism in Georgia
 Roman Georgia
 Rose Revolution
 Roustan
 Rustavi 2 TV
 Rustavi
 Rustavi Choir
 Rusudan

S 
 Saakashvili, Mikheil
 Sachkhere
 Samtredia
 Samtskhe-Saatabago
 Samtskhe-Javakheti
 Sanaia, Giorgi
 Sanakoyev, Igor
 Sanigs
 Sarishvili-Chanturia, Irine
 Saspers
 Saurmag of Iberia
 Şavşat
 Sayat-Nova
 Screeve
 Shakryl, Tamara
 Shalikashvili, John
 Shamba, Sergey
 Shartava, Zhiuli
 Shaumyan, Stepan
 Shevardnadze, Eduard
 Şeytan Castle
 Shida Kartli
 Shorapani
 Shota Rustaveli State Prize
 Shota Rustaveli
 Shuakhevi
 Shushanik
 Siege of Phasis
 Sien
 Sigua, Tengiz
 Since Otar Left
 Sissaouri, Guivi
 Solomon I of Imereti
 Solomon II of Imereti
 South Caucasian languages
 South Caucasus
 South Ossetia
 Soviet Union
 Stalin, Joseph
 Statue of Medea
 Subdivisions of Georgia
 Sukhumi
 Supreme Council of the Republic of Georgia
 Svan language
 Svaneti

T 
 Tabal
 Tabidze, Galaktion
 Takaishvili, Ekvtime
 Taktakishvili, Otar
 Tamar of Georgia
 Taochi
 Tao-Klarjeti
 Tariverdiev Mikael
 Tavisupleba
 Tbilisi
 Tbilisi hijacking incident
 Tbilisi Metro
 Tbilisi State University
 Telavi
 Telecommunications in Georgia
 Terek River
 Tetri Giorgi
 Tetri
 Tetritsqaro
 Tibareni
 The Knight in the Panther's Skin
 Toradze, Alexander
 Tmogvi earthquake, 1088
 Tornike Eristavi
 Transair Georgia airliner shootdowns
 Transcaucasian Democratic Federative Republic
 Transcaucasian SFSR
 Transportation in Georgia (country)
 Treaty of Georgievsk
 Tsaava, Londer
 Tsereteli, Akaki
 Tsereteli, Giorgi
 Tsereteli, Grigol
 Tsereteli, Irakli
 Tsereteli, Mikheil
 Tsereteli, Vasil
 Tsereteli, Zurab
 Tskhinvali
 Tsq'altubo
 Tsugba, Vyacheslav
 Turashvili, David

U 
 Union of Citizens of Georgia
 Union of Georgian Traditionalists
 United Abkhazia
 United National Movement (Georgia)
 United Nations Observer Mission in Georgia
 Unity (Georgia)
 Usupov, Raul
 Utupurshi
 Uznadze, Dimitri

V 
 Vakhtang I Gorgasali
 Vakhtang II of Georgia
 Vakhtang III of Georgia
 Vakhtang VI of Kartli
 Vani
 Varshalomidze, Levan
 Vazha-Pshavela
 Voronya Cave

Z 
 Zakariadze, Sergo
 Zan people
 Zhordania, Noe
 Zhvania, Zurab
 Zourabichvili, Salome
 Zugdidi
 Zviadists
 Zydretae

See also 

 Lists of country-related topics

 
Georgia
Georgia (country)